The Freeway Bureau is the government agency under the Ministry of Transportation and Communications of the Taiwan (ROC) in charge for freeway-related matters.

History
The bureau was originally established on 8 June 1970 as Freeway Engineering Bureau. On 1 December 1978, it was renamed to Taiwan Area National Freeway Bureau.

On 12 February 2018, Taiwan Area National Freeway Bureau merged with Taiwan Area National Expressway Engineering Bureau, and was renamed the Freeway Bureau.

Organizational structure
 Civil Service Ethics Office
 Personnel Office
 BAS Office
 Secretary Office
 Land Division
 Construction Division
 Technical Division
 Toll and Service Division
 Traffic Management Division
 Widening Region Engineering Office
 Southern Region Engineering Office
 Central Region Engineering Office
 Northern Region Engineering Office

See also
 Ministry of Transportation and Communications (Taiwan)
 Highway system in Taiwan

References

External links
 

1970 establishments in Taiwan
Executive Yuan
Organizations based in New Taipei
Organizations established in 1970
Road transportation in Taiwan